Natalie Browne is a vocalist project name owned by Almighty Records, a dance label based in London.

The most popular person to record as 'Natalie Browne' is Juliette Jaimes, who has recorded a large number of dance and Hi-NRG covers of contemporary non-dance songs or 1980s classics for the club scene. Natalie has performed at numerous gigs within the UK, mainly within the gay scene.

Natalie's first single was in 1996 and was a cover of Celine Dion's 'It's All Coming Back to Me Now'. It has been repeatedly rumoured (but unconfirmed) that the vocalist on this first single was a different person from the later tracks. It is also believed that the vocalist also provided vocals for other projects on the label including Abbacadabra, Tasmin, Rochelle and Belle Lawrence.

In 1998 Browne caused confusion in America when the single for her version of the song "Torn" (originally by the U.S. band Ednaswap) was released.  Many copies were sold because people thought the single was the then-popular cover version by Natalie Imbruglia. Imbruglia's version was not released as a physical single in the U.S.

Natalie's single 'From Here to Eternity' was written and produced by Mike Stock and Matt Aitken of the hugely successful Stock, Aitken and Waterman production team.

Natalie Browne tracks were included on the soundtrack for Russell T Davies Channel 4 series, Queer As Folk.

Discography
"It's All Coming Back to Me Now" (single, 1996)
"Lovefool" (single, 1997)
"Torn" (single, 1998)
"My Favourite Game/Justified" (single, 1999)
"Marvellous" (single, 1999)
"Breathless" (single, 2000)
"Whole Again" (single, 2001)
"From Here to Eternity" (single, 2003)
"Fascinated/Justified" (single, 2004)
"True Faith" (single, 2005)
"Justified: The Best Of Natalie Browne" (album, 2007)

Albums

External links
Natalie Browne's discography at Almighty Records
Discogs.com on Natalie Browne

English women singers
Living people
Year of birth missing (living people)